This is a list of mayors and governors of Vienna since 1282.

Vienna is the capital city of Austria. Since 1920, it has also been an Austrian state, with its mayor doubling as the Landeshauptmann (governor or minister-president) of the State of Vienna.

Since 24 May 2018, Michael Ludwig has served as Mayor of Vienna.

Duchy and Archduchy of Austria
 Konrad Poll 1282
 Heinrich Hansgraf 1285
 Konrad von Eslarn 1287
 Konrad Poll 1288–1305
 Heinrich Chrannest 1305–1307
 Dietrich von Kahlenberg 1307
 Heinrich von d. Neisse 1308
 Niklas von Eslarn 1309
 Niklas von Eslarn 1309–1313
 Heinrich von d. Neisse 1310
 Niklas Poll 1313–1315
 Hermann von St. Pölten 1316
 Niklas von Eslarn 1316–1317
 Hermann von St. Pölten 1318
 Otto Wülfleinstorfer 1319–1323
 Stephan Chriegler 1323
 Niklas Poll 1324–1327
 Stephan Chriegler 1327–1328
 Heinrich Lang 1329–1330
 Dietrich Urbetsch 1332–1333
 Hermann Snaezl 1333–1334
 Dietrich Urbetsch 1335–1337
 Konrad von Eslarn 1337–1338
 Berthold Poll 1338–1339
 Konrad Wiltwerker 1340–1343
 Hagen von Spielberg 1343–1344
 Reinprecht Zaunrüd 1345–1347
 Friedrich von Tierna 1348–1349
 Dietrich Flusthart 1350–1351
 Friedrich von Tierna 1352
 Heinrich Würfel 1353
 Dietrich Flusthart 1354
 Haunold Schuchler the Elder 1354
 Leopold Polz 1355
 Heinrich Straicher 1356–1357
 Haunold Schuchler the Elder 1357–1358
 Leopold Polz 1358–1360
 Heinrich Straicher 1359–1360
 Haunold Schuchler the Elder 1360–1361
 Hans von Tierna 1362–1364
 Friedrich Rüschl 1364
 Lukas Popfinger 1365–1366
 Thomas Swaeml 1366–1367
 Niklas Würfel 1368–1370
 Thomas Swaeml 1370–1371
 Ulrich Rößl 1372–1374
 Jans am Kienmarkt 1374–1376
 Paul Holzkäufl 1376–1379
 Jans am Kienmarkt 1379–1381
 Paul Holzkäufl 1381–1386
 Michael Geukramer 1386–1395
 Paul Holzkäufl 1396
 Paul Würfel 1396–1397
 Jakob Dorn 1398
 Hans Rockh 1398–1399
 Paul Holzkäufl 1399–1400
 Berthold Lang 1401
 Paul Würfel 1401–1403
 Haunold Schuchler the Younger 1402–1403
 Konrad Vorlauf 1403–1404
 Paul Würfel 1404–1405
 Rudolf Angerfelder 1405–1406
 Konrad Vorlauf 1406–1408
 Konrad Rampersdorffer 1408
 Hans Feldsberger 1408–1409
 Paul Geyr 1410
 Albrecht Zetter 1410–1411
 Rudolf Angerfelder 1411–1419
 Hans Musterer 1420–1421
 Ulrich Gundloch 1422
 Konrad Holzler the Elder 1423–1425
 Hans Scharffenberger 1425–1426
 Paul Würfel the Younger 1427
 Niklas Undermhimmel 1428–1429
 Konrad Holzler the Elder 1430–1433
 Hans Steger 1434–1439
 Niklas Undermhimmel 1438
 Konrad Holzler the Elder 1440–1441
 Andre Hiltprant 1442
 Hans Steger 1443
 Hans Haringseer 1444–1446
 Hans Steger 1447–1449
 Konrad Holzler the Younger 1450–1451
 Oswald Reicholf 1452
 Niklas Teschler 1453
 Oswald Reicholf 1454
 Konrad Holzler the Younger 1455
 Niklas Teschler 1456–1457
 Thomas Schwarz 1457
 Jakob Starch 1457–1460
 Christian Prenner 1461–1462
 Sebastian Ziegelhauser 1462
 Wolfgang Holzer 1462–1463
 Friedrich Ebmer 1463
 Ulrich Metzleinstorffer 1464–1466
 Martin Enthaimer 1467
 Andreas Schönbrucker 1467–1473
 Hans Heml 1473–1479
 Laurenz Haiden 1479–1484
 Stephan Een 1485–1486
 Leonhard Radauner 1487–1489
 Laurenz Taschendorfer 1489–1490
 Stephan Een 1490
 Paul Keck 1490–1493
 Friedrich Geldreich 1494–1496
 Paul Keck 1497 – 99
 Wolfgang Rieder 1500–1501
 Leonhard Lackner 1502
 Wolfgang Zauner 1503
 Paul Keck 1504–1507
 Sigmund Pernfuß 1507
 Paul Keck 1508
 Wolfgang Rieder 1509–1510
 Hans Süß 1511–1512
 Leonhard Pudmannsdorfer 1512
 Hans Kuchler 1513
 Friedrich Piesch 1514
 Johann Kaufmann 1515
 Hans Süß 1516
 Hans Rinner 1516–1517
 Leonhard Pudmannsdorfer 1518
 Wolfgang Kirchhofer 1519–1520
 Hans Süß 1520
 Martin Siebenbürger 1520–1521
 Gabriel Guetrater 1522–1524
 Hans Süß 1524–1526

Habsburg Monarchy
 Roman Staudinger 1526
 Sebastian Sulzbeck 1527
 Wolfgang Treu 1528–1530
 Sebastian Eysler 1531
 Wolfgang Treu 1532–1533
 Johann Pilhamer 1534–1535
 Wolfgang Treu 1536–1537
 Hermes Schallautzer 1538–1539
 Paul Pernfuß 1540–1541
 Stephan Tenck 1542–46
 Sebastian Schrantz 1547–1548
 Sebastian Hutstocker 1549–1550
 Christoph Hayden 1551–1552
 Sebastian Hutstocker 1553–1555
 Hans Übermann 1556–1557
 Georg Prantstetter 1558–1559
 Thomas Siebenbürger 1560–1561
 Hermann Bayr 1562–1563
 Matthias Brunnhofer 1564–1565
 Hans Übermann 1566–1567
 Georg Prantstetter 1568–1569
 Hanns von Thau 1570–1571
 Georg Prantstetter 1572–1573
 Hanns von Thau 1574–1575
 Christoph Hutstocker 1576–1577
 Hanns von Thau 1578–1579
 Bartholomäus Prantner 1580–1581
 Hanns von Thau 1582–1583
 Bartholomäus Prantner 1584–1585
 Oswald Hüttendorfer 1586–1587
 Hanns von Thau 1588–1589
 Georg Fürst 1590–1591
 Bartholomäus Prantner 1592–1595
 Paul Steyrer 1596–1597
 Oswald Hüttendorfer 1598–1599
 Andreas Rieder 1600 – 01
 Georg Fürst 1602 – 03
 Augustin Haffner 1604 – 07
 Lukas Lausser 1608 – 09
 Daniel Moser 1610 – 13
 Veit Resch 1614 – 15
 Daniel Moser 1616 – 22
 Paul Wiedemann 1623 – 25
 Daniel Moser 1626 – 37
 Christoph Faßoldt 1638 – 39
 Konrad Bramber 1640 – 45
 Caspar Bernhardt 1646 – 48
 Johann Georg Dietmayr 1648 – 53
 Thomas Wolfgang Puechenegger 1654 – 55
 Johann Georg Dietmayr von Dietmannsdorf 1656 – 59
 Johann Christoph Holzner 1660 – 63
 Johann Georg Dietmayr von Dietmannsdorf 1664 – 67
 Johann Christoph Holzner 1667 – 69
 Daniel Lazarus Springer 1670 – 73
 Peter Sebastian Fügenschuh 1674 – 77
 Daniel Lazarus Springer 1678 – 79
 Johann Andreas von Liebenberg 1680 – 83
 Simon Stephan Schuster 1684 – 87
 Daniel Fockhy 1688 – 91
 Johann Franz Peickhardt 1692 – 95
 Jakob Daniel Tepser 1696 – 99
 Johann Franz Peickhardt 1700 – 03
 Jakob Daniel Tepser 1704 – 07
 Johann Franz Wenighoffer 1708 – 12
 Johann Lorenz Trunck von Guttenberg 1713 – 16
 Josef Hartmann 1717 – 20
 Franz Josef Hauer 1721 – 24
 Josef Hartmann 1725 – 26
 Franz Josef Hauer 1727 – 28
 Johann Franz Purck 1729 – 30
 Franz Daniel Edler von Bartuska 1731 – 32
 Andreas Ludwig Leitgeb 1733 – 36
 Johann Adam von Zahlheim 1737 – 40
 Peter Joseph Kofler 1741 – 44
 Andreas Ludwig Leitgeb 1745 – 51
 Peter Joseph Edler von Kofler 1751 – 64
 Leopold Franz Gruber 1764
 Josef Anton Bellesini 1764 – 67
 Leopold Franz Gruber 1767 – 73
 Josef Georg Hörl 1773–1804

Austrian Empire and Austria-Hungary
 Stephan Edler von Wohlleben 1804 – 23
 Anton Joseph Edler von Leeb 1835 – 37
 Ignaz Czapka 1838 – 48
 Johann Kaspar Freiherr von Seiller 1851 – 61
 Andreas Zelinka 1861 – 68
 Cajetan Freiherr von Felder 1868 – 78
 Julius von Newald 1878 – 82
 Eduard Uhl 1882 – 89
 Johann Prix 1889 – 94
 Raimund Grübl 1894 – 95
 Hans von Friebeis 1895 – 96
 Josef Strobach 1896 – 97
 Karl Lueger 1897–1910 (CS)
 Josef Neumayer 1910 – 12 (CS)
 Richard Weiskirchner 1912 – 18 (CS)

First Austrian Republic
 Richard Weiskirchner 1918–1919 (CS)
 Jakob Reumann 1919–1922 (SDAPÖ)

Mayors and governors of Vienna
In 1922, the city of Vienna was constituted as a separate state of Austria. It had previously been the capital of Lower Austria. Thus Vienna's mayor also has the rank of a state governor.

See also
Vienna
History of Vienna
Timeline of Vienna

 
Mayors
Vienna